The Comprehensive Knowledge Archive Network (CKAN) is an open-source open data portal for the storage and distribution of open data. Being initially inspired by the package management capabilities of Debian Linux, CKAN has developed into a powerful data catalogue system that is mainly used by public institutions seeking to share their data with the general public.

CKAN's codebase is maintained by Open Knowledge Foundation. The system is used both as a public platform on Datahub and in various government data catalogues, such as the UK's data.gov.uk, the Dutch National Data Register, the United States government's Data.gov and the Australian government's "Gov 2.0". The state government of South Australia also makes government data freely available to the public on the CKAN platform. The Italian government makes available the open data of the Data & Analytics Framework on the CKAN platform.

Internal technology 
CKAN's back end, the part running on the Web server, is written mainly in Python. The web pages it offers to user browsers include JavaScript. CKAN maintains information about the data sets to be offered to users in PostgreSQL databases. Searches are implemented by Solr. CKAN installations can be queried through Web APIs.

Future of the project 
The Open Knowledge Foundation Board supported the CKAN Stewardship proposal jointly put forward by Link Digital and Datopian.
In appointing joint stewardship to Link Digital and Datopian, the Board felt there was a clear practical path with strong leadership and committed funding to see CKAN grow and prosper in the years to come.
The Open Knowledge Foundation will remain the ‘purpose trustee’ to ensure the Stewards remain true to the purpose and ethos of the CKAN project.

Similar projects and alternatives 

 Dataverse provides similar functions and is widely used for open data.
 DKAN is a Drupal-based open data portal based on CKAN.

References

External links 
 
 Open Knowledge Foundation
 South Australian Government Data Directory
 Commonly Used Open Data Platforms

Open data
Archive networks
Software using the GNU AGPL license